Dark most commonly refers to darkness, the absence of light.

Dark or DARK may also refer to:

 Evil, sinister or malign

People
 Dark (surname)

Entertainment
 Dark (TV series), a 2017 Netflix original German language science-fiction drama series
 Dark (broadcasting), a broadcasting service that has ceased transmission
 "Dark" (Legend of the Seeker), an episode of Legend of the Seeker
 Dark (video game), a stealth/action video game
 Dark (album), a 2012 album by Hwyl Nofio
"Dark", song by Prince from Come (Prince album)
 Dark Mousy, a character in the anime D.N.Angel
 G. M. Dark, a fictional character from the novel Something Wicked This Way Comes
 DARK, a criminal organisation featured in the manga and anime Kikaider
 D.A.R.K. (band) alt-rock band

See also
 
 Dark Dark Dark (band) U.S. folk band
 Dərk, Azerbaijan
 Dark data
 Dark Eye (disambiguation)
 Dark triad
 Darke (disambiguation)
 Darker (disambiguation)
 The Dark (disambiguation)
 Dark chocolate